Lewis Coult (born 7 June 1988) is a Scottish professional football forward who last played for Newtongrange Star.

Career
Coult was born in Edinburgh, where he grew up supporting Hearts with whom he began his career as a youth player. He then joined Hamilton Academical where he made his senior debut aged 17, on 2 January 2006, in the Scottish First Division against Airdrie United. He went on loan to Alloa Athletic before joining Berwick Rangers. Coult came off the bench to set two goals up for strike partner Iain Diack in a League One game with Alloa however found himself released at the end of Berwick's miserable season.

A three-month spell in Florida with Miami All-Stars, followed by a brief spell in the E.A.D.S.A.F.A division in the Edinburgh Amateur leagues. This was also followed by Junior football with Leith Athletic and Arniston Rangers.

On 4 January 2011, Coult signed for Scottish First Division side Cowdenbeath. He made his debut on 15 January 2011, in a 3–0 defeat to Greenock Morton. He scored his first goal for the club on 11 May in a 2–2 draw with Brechin City in the play-offs, but were ultimately relegated after a 2–0 defeat in the second leg. In all he made 19 appearances scoring once in his debut season. Coult signed a new contract in January 2012 extending his stay to May 2013. He left the club in May 2013 and signed a one-year deal with Airdrieonians. Despite scoring 6 league goals, Coult left Airdrieonians in May 2014.

On 28 May 2015 Coult join Arbroath.

On 31 Aug 2015 Coult left Arbroath, by mutual consent.

Career statistics

Personal life

References

External links

1988 births
Living people
Footballers from Edinburgh
Scottish footballers
Association football forwards
Airdrieonians F.C. players
Heart of Midlothian F.C. players
Hamilton Academical F.C. players
Alloa Athletic F.C. players
Berwick Rangers F.C. players
Leith Athletic F.C. players
Arniston Rangers F.C. players
Scottish Football League players
Scottish Professional Football League players
Stirling Albion F.C. players